Chapman Peak is located in the Livingston Range, Glacier National Park in the U.S. state of Montana. Chapman Peak is situated along the Continental Divide. The mountain is named for Robert H. Chapman, one of the US Geological Survey topographers who worked on mapping Glacier Park between 1900 and 1904.

Climate

Based on the Köppen climate classification, Chapman Peak is located in a subarctic climate zone characterized by long, usually very cold winters, and short, cool to mild summers. Winter temperatures can drop below −10 °F with wind chill factors below −30 °F.

Geology

Like other mountains in Glacier National Park, Chapman Peak is composed of sedimentary rock laid down during the Precambrian to Jurassic periods.

References

Livingston Range
Mountains of Flathead County, Montana
Mountains of Glacier County, Montana
Mountains of Glacier National Park (U.S.)
Mountains of Montana